Richard Piers Rayner is an English comic book artist. He is best known for his work on Road to Perdition.

Biography
Richard Piers Rayner began his professional comic career in 1988, illustrating for DC Comics and Marvel Comics. His works include Hellblazer, Swamp Thing, L.E.G.I.O.N., Doctor Fate, and Doctor Who. His most notable work is Road to Perdition, written by Max Allan Collins, which was adapted into a film in 2002, starring Tom Hanks, and directed by Sam Mendes.

He is also a frequent contributor to the DC publications, Paradox Press, and is artist in residence at Middlesbrough FC.  In November 2008 he wrote and illustrated Middlesbrough FC - The Unseen History.

Awards
 1989: Won the "Russ Manning Promising Newcomer" Eisner Award

Bibliography
His comics work includes:

Hellblazer #10-16 (with Jamie Delano, Vertigo, 1988-1989)
The Big Book Of (Paradox Press):
Big Book of Urban Legends
Big Book of Weirdos
Big Book of Death
Big Book of Conspiracies
Big Book of Freaks
Big Book of Little Criminals
Big Book of Losers
Big Book of the Weird Wild West
Big Book of Grimm
Road to Perdition (with Max Allan Collins, 204 pages, Pocket Books, June 1998,  Titan Books, August 2002, Simon & Schuster, July 2002, Paradox Press, April 2005)

Notes

References

External links

Richard Piers Rayner on Lambiek's Comiclopedia

English comics artists
Living people
Year of birth missing (living people)
People from Scarborough, North Yorkshire
Place of birth missing (living people)